The 2015 Nigerian Senate election in Yobe State was held on March 28, 2015, to elect members of the Nigerian Senate to represent Yobe State. Bukar Ibrahim representing Yobe East and Ahmad Lawan representing Yobe North won on the platform of All Progressives Congress, while Mohammed Hasan representing Yobe South won on the platform of Peoples Democratic Party.

Overview

Summary

Results

Yobe East 
All Progressives Congress candidate Bukar Ibrahim won the election, defeating People's Democratic Party candidate Abba Gana Tata and other party candidates.

Yobe North 
All Progressives Congress candidate Ahmad Lawan won the election, defeating People's Democratic Party candidate Yerima Lawan and other party candidates.

Yobe South 
Peoples Democratic Party candidate Mohammed Hasan won the election, defeating All Progressives Congress candidate Alkali Abdulkadir and other party candidates.

References 

Yobe State Senate elections
March 2015 events in Nigeria
Yob